Linanthus bellus is an uncommon species of flowering plant in the phlox family known by the common name desertbeauty. It is known only from northern Baja California and eastern San Diego County, California, where it grows in high desert chaparral in sandy soils. This is a petite annual herb producing short, threadlike stems lined with occasional tiny needle-lobed leaves. The inflorescence is usually a single tiny flower with bright pink lobes no more than a centimeter across. The flower has a yellow throat with purple spots.

References

External links
Jepson Manual Treatment
Sierra Club Status c.1994
Photo gallery

bellus
Flora of Baja California
Flora of California